The Papar (from Latin papa, via Old Irish, meaning "father" or "pope") were, according to early Icelandic sagas, Irish monks who took eremitic residence in parts of what is now Iceland before that island's habitation by the Norsemen of Scandinavia, as evidenced by the sagas and recent archaeological findings.

Origins
The first Norsemen began settling in Iceland in 874 CE. The oldest Scandinavian source mentioning the existence of the Papar, however, the Íslendingabók ("Book of the Icelanders") by Icelandic chronicler Ari Þorgilsson, was written between 1122 and 1133, some time after the event. Ari writes of "Christian men", titled the 'Papar' by the Norsemen, who departed the isle because of their dislike of the 'heathen' Norse, pointing to the possibility of the Papar having arrived before the Norse.

An earlier source that could possibly refer to the Papar is the work of Dicuil, an early 9th-century Irish monk and geographer, which included mention of the wandering of "holy men" to the lands of the north. However, it is not known whether Dicuil is speaking about Iceland, as Gaelic-Irish hermits also settled in other islands of the north such as Orkney and Shetland.

Several Icelandic toponyms have been linked to the Papar, including the island of Papey and the Vestmannaeyjar ("islands of the Westmen"), but no archaeological evidence in these places has yet confirmed the link.

Another theory is that the two sources were conflated and that Þorgilsson based his history on the writings of Dicuil.

The Landnámabók (The Icelandic Book of Settlements), possibly dating from the 11th century in its original form, clearly states on page one that Irish monks had been living on Iceland before the arrival of Norse settlers. According to this account, the basis behind this knowledge was monks' leaving behind numerous reminders of their stay, including Irish books, bells and crosiers, helping the Norse to identify their predecessors. According to the Landnámabók, the Irish monks left the island either when the Norse arrived or were no longer living there when the Norse arrived.

Papar in the Faroes 
There are also several toponyms relating to the Papar in the Faroe Islands. Among these are Paparøkur near Vestmanna, and Papurshílsur near Saksun. Vestmanna, in fact, is short for Vestmannahøvn, meaning the "harbour of the Westmen" (Gaels). A churchyard on the island of Skúgvoy also has tombstones which display a possible Gaelic origin or influence.

Some of the sagas suggest that Grímr, a Norse explorer, may have been responsible for driving them out, despite probably being a Norse–Gael himself:

Papar in the Northern Isles 

The 12th-century Historia Norwegiæ speculatively identifies the native Picts and Papar as those that the Norse discovered when they invaded Orkney in the early ninth century.
 Ekrem and Mortensen point out  "The author of HN does not agree with  the earlier work of Ari (Íslendingabók), who writes that they were Christians and Irish.  More recent research confirms the Irish Celtic Christian missionaries, principally through Dalriadic Gaels  prior to Norwegian rule. 

Historian Joseph Anderson noted in his Introduction to Orkneyinga Saga several Island toponyms deriving from 'Papar', suggesting their influence upon the region:

Papar in the Hebrides 
The Outer Hebrides have numerous Papar-influenced toponyms, but with the crucial difference that the Norse language died out early in this area and it is arguable whether Scottish Gaelic ever died out at all. There are at least three islands originally named Papey and renamed "Pabbay" in the Outer Hebrides of Scotland:

Pabbay, Barra Isles
Pabbay, Harris
Pabay, the Inner Hebrides near Skye
Pabaigh, Loch Baghasdail, South Uist

See also 

Culdees
Gaelic Ireland
Great Ireland
Christianization of Scandinavia
Papa, Scotland

References

Further reading
Barbara E. Crawford (ed.) The Papar in the North Atlantic: Environment and History – The Proceeding of a Day Conference. University of St. Andrews Committee for Dark Age Studies, 2002.

External links
 Axel Kristinsson, Is there any tangible proof that there were Irish monks in Iceland before the time of the Viking settlements?
 Sandnes, Berit (2010) "Linguistic patterns in the place-names of Norway and the Northern Isles" Northern Lights, Northern Words. Selected Papers from the FRLSU Conference, Kirkwall 2009, edited by Robert McColl Millar.
 Is Iceland’s language a Norse code – or legacy of Celtic settlers?

Christianity in medieval Ireland
Christianity in medieval Scotland
History of Christianity in Iceland
Medieval Iceland